Pterolophia australis is a species of beetle in the family Cerambycidae. It was described by Stephan von Breuning in 1957. It is endemic to Cockatoo Island.

References

australis
Beetles described in 1957